Delphine Combe (born 6 December 1974 in Aubenas, Ardèche) is a French sprinter. She won a bronze medal in 4 x 100 metres relay at the 1997 World Championships in Athletics and a gold medal in the same event at the 2002 European Championships in Athletics.

Personal bests
100 metres – 11.35 (2002)
200 metres – 23.27 (2002)

External links

1974 births
Living people
People from Aubenas
French female sprinters
World Athletics Championships medalists
European Athletics Championships medalists
Athletes (track and field) at the 1996 Summer Olympics
Sportspeople from Ardèche